The highland temperate climates are a temperate climate sub-type, although located in tropical zone, isothermal and with characteristics different from others temperate climates like oceanic or mediterranean where they are often are included without proper differentiation.

The mainly difference is that it is isothermal, this mean that it has low termic range between months, whose cause is altitude and not latitude, no four seasons (spring, summer, autumn, winter) of temperate zone. However, there are rainfall variation (dry season and wet season). It is usually said that it have a Eternal Spring or a Eternal Autumn.  These are sometimes called "tropical highland climates" or "highland tropical climates", though the name is a misnomer other than regional location.

A letter "i" is added to indicate its isothermal condition (Cfb, oceanic climate, Cfbi, highland humid temperate climate).

Location
It is characteristic of South and central México highlands, Central America mountains, North Andes in South America and East Africa mountains, among a few other areas like Borneo and New Guinea highlands.

Causes and characteristics
Altitude generate a difference with lowlands. Temperature and atmospheric pression decrease, approximately 0,6 °C or 1 °C every 100 m. This s because to the adiabatic rate air.

In summary, this climates are generate because of temperature decrease on tropical zone, at same latitudes where appear tropical climates, located between 0 and 1500 m, while from 1500 m until 3000 m (depending on latitude) appear highland temperate climate, semihumid and isothermal. Above 3500 m is the alpine tundra climate ETH, identified with páramo and puna vegetation.

This climate often has been called oceanic Cfb or mediterranean Csb, however, it is not mediterranean since it is not found in temperate latitudes, do not limit with deserts and neither it is oceanic, because humidity here do not comes from ocean but of tropical rainforest near (Congo, Amazon, Chocó).

Temperatures are cool all year, approximately between 12 °C and 19 °C mean all months and year. Nevertheless, there are high daily range termic, between day and night, around 10 °C. There may be high nubosity and air humidity. Clear skis are rare.

Precipitations, only as rainfall, and often hail, it decrease with altitude, it is around 700mm - 2000mm, that is, higher than temperate zone.

The vegetation basically is Highland Forest, beside highland wooded savanna and scrubs.

Sub-types
The particular location of this highlands, many of which are just north of the Earth's equator but South of the metereological equator, what added to low termic range, makes defining between winter and summer speculative, sometimes it is confunde Cfbi, Cwbi and Csbi, just like it happens between tropical climates Aw and As.

Highland humid temperate climate Cfbi

Constant precipitation throughout the year, no dry season. Its temperature oscillates between 10 °C and 20 °C. Precipitation is higher than other highlands, about 1500 mm. It is the tropical variation of  the oceanic climate Cfb. It can appear anywhere within the tropical zone with much rainfall and adequate altitude.

Cities:
 Colonia Tovar, Venezuela
 Mérida, Venezuela 
 Kinabalu, Indonesia

Highland monsoon temperate climate Cwb

Rainfall come in hipotetic summer (monsoon), (usually between March and June in North Hemipshere and November and February in South Hemisphere), dry season take place in winter or cold months. Temperatures around 12 °C y 19 °C  and precipitations from 800mm. Of the three subtypes, it is the one that occurs at a higher latitude, extending to subtropical areas exceeding 15° north and south latitude, which is why it usually presents a greater termic range, between 3 °C and 4°. It is located in Peru and Bolivia highlands, mountains of Brazil, center of México and mountains of Central America and East Africa. Because of that, its vegetation is variable, from savanna until forests.

Most of the time it is simply called as Cwb, the Köppen classification for subtropical highland climates, because outside the intertropical zone it is existent.

Cities:
 Kunming, China
 Adis Abeba, Ethiopia
 Nairobi, Kenia
 La Paz, Bolivia
 Cuzco, Peru

Highland equatorial climate Csbi

Dry season math with more hot and sunny months, it has a marked wet season, with bimodal regime, where one of them is stronger than the other. Precipitation normally between 700mm y 2000mm, humidity decrease with altitude, annual rainfall decrease 100 mm every 100 m altitude. Intertropical Convergence Zone appears twice yearly, while temperature depends on altitude, generally between 12 °C and 18 °C, very stable and unchanging throughout the year.

It is located in equatorial latitudes to no more than 5°S and 5°N of equator. It is almost exclusive of Ecuadorian-Colombian Andes, located from 1500 m altitude. It consists of tropical variation of oceanic mediterranean climate Csb. Common vegetation is the highland wooded savanna. Andean forests or cloudy forests appears above 3000 m of great biodiversity.

Cities:
 Bogotá, Colombia
 Cuenca, Ecuador
 Ibarra, Ecuador
 Manizales, Colombia
 Pasto, Colombia
 Popayán, Colombia
 Quito, Ecuador
 Tunja, Colombia

See also
 Temperate climate
 Humid temperate climate
 Subhumid temperate climate
 Mediterranean climate
 Altitude
 Köppen climate classification

References

Climate and weather classification systems